KVRI (branded as Radio India) is a radio station licensed to Blaine, Washington, United States, serving Vancouver, British Columbia, Canada with a combined India News/Talk/Music format. It broadcasts on AM frequency 1600 kHz and is under ownership of Multicultural Broadcasting.

The station was operating under a LMA with Radio India, Ltd., and was broadcasting from its studios in Surrey, British Columbia until November 13, 2014, when the CRTC forced Radio India to end the LMA due to rules that prohibit a Canadian company from operating, leasing, or owning, a radio or television property in the United States solely for broadcasting to Canadians, and for operating without a license within Canada.

Radio India Ltd. is a radio station with its offices in Surrey in Greater Vancouver. As of 2015, Maninder S. Gill serves as the managing director of the station, and his sister, Baljit Bains, is the owner. Maninder Gill is the brother of the mother-in-law of Tom Gill, a Surrey city councillor, and Robert Matas of The Globe and Mail described Maninder Gill as "a prominent figure" of Vancouver's Indo-Canadian community.

As of 2004 Radio India has a clientele of first and second generation Indo-Canadians. Its shows discuss the culture, politics, and religion of India. In 2014 Gill stated that the annual advertising revenue was $2 million to $3 million.

History

On August 3, 2010, building contractor Harjit Atwal and two associates of Harjit Atwal, Jaspal Atwal and Harkirat Kular, filed a lawsuit against Maninder Gill, 11 other employees, and the radio firm itself, accusing the channel of having defamatory material about them on a Punjabi-language broadcast aired on Radio India in May of that year. This lawsuit was filed in the British Columbia Supreme Court.

Violent altercations involving the lawsuit and disputes occurred in August and September of that year. Maninder Gill faced five criminal charges after Harjit Atwal sustained gunshot injuries to his leg during a wedding held at the Guru Nanak Sikh Temple in Surrey; the police accused Gill of being responsible for the shooting. A drive-by shooting occurred at Maninder Gill's residence the following month. Maninder Gill stated that the conflict resulted from political differences regarding the Khalistan movement.

For years Radio India operated as a "pirate radio" station which did not get a license from the Canadian Radio-television and Telecommunications Commission (CRTC); therefore it avoided paying copyright tariffs and license fees and complying with rules regarding the station's content. The CRTC decided to act against the pirate stations in 2014. Radio India initially stated that it had political connections; Managing director Maninder Gill had mailed photographs of himself socializing with Canadian politicians. In a presentation in October of that year Maninder Gill said that the station was going to be shut down and asked the CRTC to give him 120 days to make the shutdown; he mentioned the connections to politicians in the same presentation. The CRTC ultimately decided that the deadline to close Radio India was Midnight Pacific time on November 14, 2014.

See also
 Indo-Canadians in Greater Vancouver

References

External links

 Radio India Ltd. - Live Stream Radio

VRI
Indo-Canadian culture
Multicultural Broadcasting stations